Tharanga Lakshitha (born 30 April 1982) is a Sri Lankan cricketer who played in 111 first-class and 99 List A matches. He made his Twenty20 debut on 17 August 2004, for Bloomfield Cricket and Athletic Club in the 2004 SLC Twenty20 Tournament. He was educated at St. Servatius' College

See also
 List of Chilaw Marians Cricket Club players

References

External links
 

1982 births
Living people
Sri Lankan cricketers
Bloomfield Cricket and Athletic Club cricketers
Chilaw Marians Cricket Club cricketers
Ruhuna Royals cricketers
People from Matara, Sri Lanka